Coles Corner is the corner of Fargate and Church Street in Sheffield, England.

Coles Corner may also refer to: 

Coles Corner (album), an album by Richard Hawley
Coles Corner, Washington, a small community in the U.S. state of Washington
Coles Corner or Cole's Corner (record shop and cafe bar on Abbeydale Road in Sheffield), opened Dec 2019 www.colescorner.co.uk

See also
Cole Brothers, now John Lewis, a department store in Sheffield, England